Modern Talking was a German pop music duo consisting of arranger, songwriter and producer Dieter Bohlen and singer Thomas Anders. They have been referred to as Germany's most successful pop duo, and have had a number of hit singles, reaching the top five in many countries. Their most popular singles are "You're My Heart, You're My Soul", "You Can Win If You Want", "Cheri, Cheri Lady", "Brother Louie", "Atlantis Is Calling (S.O.S. for Love)" and "Geronimo's Cadillac".

Modern Talking worked together from 1983 to 1987, then the band disbanded. In 1998, they reunited and made a successful comeback, recording and releasing music from 1998 to 2003. The duo released singles (many of which involved American rapper Eric Singleton) which again entered the top ten in Germany and abroad, one of which was the re-recorded version of "You're My Heart, You're My Soul '98". After the duo's second and final break-up in 2003, their global sales had reached 120 million singles and albums combined.

History

1983–1987: Beginning

First formed in West Berlin in early 1983, they unexpectedly became popular in the beginning of 1985 with "You're My Heart, You're My Soul", with which they occupied top ten positions in 35 countries including their homeland where the single perched at the top for six consecutive weeks, the single eventually went on to sell eight million copies worldwide. The track was then followed by another number-one hit, "You Can Win If You Want", which was released in the middle of 1985 from the debut album The 1st Album. The album was certified platinum in Germany for selling over 500,000 units.

Soon after their second hit, Modern Talking released the single "Cheri, Cheri Lady" which also quickly climbed to the top of the charts in West Germany, Switzerland, Austria and Norway, meanwhile entering the top ten in Sweden and the Netherlands. The single, being the only track released from their second album Let's Talk About Love, managed to push the album to a platinum status in West Germany for sales of over 500,000. The success continued with another two number one singles, "Brother Louie" and "Atlantis Is Calling (S.O.S. for Love)", both from the third album, Ready for Romance. The duo also charted high with their sixth single "Geronimo's Cadillac" from the fourth album In the Middle of Nowhere, and "Jet Airliner" from their fifth album Romantic Warriors.

Due to their lacklusterly received sixth album, Bohlen announced the end of the project during an interview, while Anders was in Los Angeles. This sparked further animosities between the two, who had had a tumultuous and quarreling relationship even when they were together. According to Bohlen, the main reason for breaking up the group was Anders' then-wife Nora, who refused to have her husband interviewed by female reporters, and constantly demanded huge changes made to shows, videos or recordings, a fact that Anders later admitted in his biography. After a final phone call during which both men heavily insulted each other, they refused to speak with each other for over 10 years.

During this era, Modern Talking were successful in Europe, Asia, South America, the Middle East and in Iran. In the United Kingdom, they entered the top five only once, with the song "Brother Louie". In 1985, RCA signed Modern Talking for a US deal and released their first album in the US, but they remained almost unknown in North America, never appearing on the US charts. They released two albums each year between 1985 and 1987, while also promoting their singles on television all over Europe, eventually selling sixty-five million records within three years.

Notably, Modern Talking were one of the first Western bloc bands allowed to sell their records in the Soviet Union. After four decades of Cold War censorship and import restrictions, Mikhail Gorbachev's Glasnost reforms in 1986 opened the Soviet sphere to Western bands, including Modern Talking at the height of their popularity. As a result, they still maintain a large fanbase in Eastern Europe.

Between 1987 and 1997
Immediately after the duo split in mid-1987, Bohlen formed his own project called Blue System and enjoyed several high chart positions, with tracks like "Sorry Little Sarah", "My Bed Is Too Big", "Under My Skin", "Love Suite", "Laila" and "Déjà vu". Meanwhile, Anders went solo, touring under the name of Modern Talking on several continents until the beginning of 1989, when he started to record some of his new pop-like material in LA and London, and also in his native country. Anders recorded five solo albums in English, Different, Whispers, Down on Sunset, When Will I See You Again and Souled, and one of his albums was also recorded in Spanish Barcos de Cristal. He was more successful in foreign countries than his own country, yet he also reached several hits in Germany. Despite all the quarrels and disagreements that Bohlen and Anders got into with each other in the past, they began staying in touch again after Anders moved back to Koblenz, Germany in 1994.

1998–2003: Reunion
In the beginning of 1998, the duo reunited and had their first performance together in March on the German TV show Wetten, dass..?. They released a remixed version of their 1984 single "You're My Heart, You're My Soul", which features Eric Singleton on the rap vocals. Their first comeback album Back for Good, which included four new tracks, as well as all of the previous hits remixed with modern techniques, stayed at number one in Germany for five consecutive weeks and managed to top the charts in fifteen countries, eventually selling three million copies in Europe alone. The duo won the award for Best Selling German Band at the World Music Awards that year. The follow-up album Alone also went straight to number one in Germany and was very successful elsewhere; the album managed to sell over one million units in Europe alone.

Bohlen and Anders followed the 1980s Modern Talking pattern as they chose to release two singles from each album, as in the past. A series of singles and four more albums followed such as Year of the Dragon, America, Victory and Universe. After reaching the point where they had already collected over 400 gold and platinum awards worldwide, Bohlen and Anders decided to disband again in 2003 just before the release of another best-of compilation. The second break-up seemed to have been triggered mainly from the negative portrayal of Anders by Bohlen written in his autobiography published on 4 October 2003. In the course of all the disputes which eventually drove the duo to its break-up, Bohlen was involved in Deutschland sucht den Superstar (DSDS), the German edition of the UK's Pop Idol. The compilation album was released in 2003 entitled The Final Album which contained all of the duo's singles. Thomas Anders started another solo career immediately after the end of Modern Talking, while Bohlen had by now begun devoting most of his time to new talents, especially those he discovered on DSDS.

Musical style and production

In 1984, Bohlen cited the hit single "Precious Little Diamond" (by Fox the Fox), as his inspiration for using falsetto choruses. The studio vocal line up of Rolf Köhler, Michael Scholz, Detlef Wiedeke and (on early albums) Birger Corleis, in addition to Bohlen and Anders, produced the high choruses characteristic of Modern Talking. Köhler, Scholz and Wiedeke later went on to work with Bohlen in Blue System, before joining with songwriter Thomas Widrat to form Systems in Blue. Köhler, Scholz and Wiedeke were never credited on the Modern Talking albums, and eventually went to court over the matter. They received an out of court settlement and Bohlen published a sleeve note for his next release (Obsession, by Blue System), acknowledging the trio's contribution.

Further influences include German-language schlager music, disco pop (the Bee Gees) and romantic English-language songs of Italian and French origin, like Gazebo's "I Like Chopin". After the 1998 reunion, Bohlen produced Eurodance as well as American-style MOR ballads.

Dieter Bohlen also composed for other artists while still in Modern Talking, such as for Chris Norman and Smokie, whose song "Midnight Lady" (1986) remains Bohlen's most popular composition. He also composed a large number of tracks for C. C. Catch, using an accelerated, less-romantic sound. Some English Bohlen songs such as "You're My Heart, You're My Soul" were also recorded with German lyrics by Mary Roos, using the same playback tracks. When Modern Talking disbanded in 1987, a number of tracks written for the last album were re-arranged and then transferred onto Bohlen's first solo album by Blue System. Modern Talking's sixth album was released about the same time as the first single from Blue System, "Sorry Little Sarah", where Bohlen competed on the charts against Modern Talking's "In 100 Years" hit song.

Global sales of Modern Talking, after the duo's second and final break-up in 2003, had reached 120 million singles and albums combined, making them the biggest-selling German music act in history.

Post years and legacy

In 2006, Bohlen included a secret message in his song "Bizarre Bizarre" when played backwards: "There will never be an end to Modern Talking". Bohlen's response: "I meant to say that the music of Modern Talking will live forever". Anders has kept the Modern Talking songs in his repertoire and produced songs in a similar vein for his solo records ("Independent Girl"). In 2006, he produced an album Songs Forever of swing and jazz versions of popular songs (including Modern Talking's first hit). Bohlen has written two autobiographical books about Modern Talking's history from his perspective. The first book sold a million copies in Germany. The sequel was heavily criticised for his unfairness towards the people he worked with. As a result of that, Bohlen withdrew from the public for a year until 2006, when he said he regretted putting out the second book. Anders had not been the only one pressing charges against Bohlen and demanding that sections of the book be modified. Frank Farian was also angered by Bohlen's literary output and released a book in which he tried to expose Bohlen as a fraud. Bohlen's first book was the basis of an animated comedy film called Dieter: Der Film. The soundtrack of this film contains a new Modern Talking song "Shooting Star" which had been created using fragments of vocal recordings from previous Modern Talking titles from the "Year of the Dragon" album.

Music critics were unenthusiastic about Modern Talking and gave the band lackluster reviews because of their music and performance. Although recognizing the catchiness and professional production of the songs, the lack of originality was criticized by British representatives of these genres of music, such as the Pet Shop Boys or Erasure. In particular, it was criticized that many of their songs would sound quite similar; a fact that Bohlen also openly admitted to Der Spiegel in 1989:

Band members

Discography

Studio albums
The 1st Album (1985)
Let's Talk About Love (1985)
Ready for Romance (1986)
In the Middle of Nowhere (1986)
Romantic Warriors (1987)
In the Garden of Venus (1987)
Back for Good (1998)
Alone (1999)
Year of the Dragon (2000)
America (2001)
Victory (2002)
Universe (2003)
The Final Album (2003)

Awards and nominations

See also
Blue System
Dieter: Der Film
 t.A.T.u. - a similar pop duo which also plays electropop

References

External links

 
1983 establishments in West Germany
2003 disestablishments in Germany
German musical duos
Dance-pop groups
German synthpop groups
Male musical duos
Musical groups established in 1983
Musical groups disestablished in 1987
Musical groups reestablished in 1998
Musical groups disestablished in 2003
Musical groups from Berlin
Eurodisco groups
Europop groups
Pop music duos
Ariola Records artists
Sony BMG artists
World Music Awards winners
Hansa Records artists
RCA Records artists